W. W. Hartwell House & Dependencies, also known as Regina Maria Retreat House, is a historic home located at Plattsburgh in Clinton County, New York.  It was built about 1870 and is an elaborate stone mansion featuring a three-story tower with a Mansard roof in the Second Empire style.  The house is set among park-like landscaping.  Also on the property are a cottage and a stone carriage house.

It was listed on the National Register of Historic Places in 1982.

References

Houses on the National Register of Historic Places in New York (state)
Houses completed in 1870
Second Empire architecture in New York (state)
Houses in Clinton County, New York
National Register of Historic Places in Clinton County, New York